Asianet News Network (ANN) is an Indian news media company incorporated in the year 2008. It is a subsidiary of Jupiter Entertainment, a subsidiary of Jupiter Capital. Asianet News Network operates Malayalam news channel Asianet News, Kannada news channel Suvarna News and Kannada daily Kannada Prabha. It also operates separate news portals in English, Telugu, and Tamil languages. Jupiter Capital is an investor in English news channel Republic TV.

Channels and web portals

References

Mass media companies of India
Television networks in India
Television channels and stations established in 1995
Mass media companies established in 1995
Indian companies established in 1995
1995 establishments in Kerala
Companies established in 1995
Indian subsidiaries of foreign companies
Television broadcasting companies of India
Broadcasting